The Beth Yaakov Synagogue is a synagogue in Madrid, Spain.

Jews began to return to Spain in the nineteenth century, long after the execution and movement of Catholicism throughout the entirety of Spain and established a synagogue in Madrid in 1917.  After the Republican government was defeated by Franco’s forces in the Spanish Civil War (1936-39),  Catholicism was proclaimed the official State religion and the synagogues were closed. A number of Jewish families arrived from Morocco, and soon established informal house synagogues.

The present synagogue was built in 1968, after passage of the "Religious Freedom Law" of 1967.

References

External link

Synagogues in Spain
Religious buildings and structures in Madrid
Moroccan diaspora in Europe
Synagogues completed in 1968
1968 establishments in Spain
Modernist architecture in Spain
Buildings and structures in Trafalgar neighborhood, Madrid
Moroccan-Jewish diaspora